Miles Mason (1752–1822) was a chinaman in Fenchurch Street who sold imported porcelain from China. When these imports ceased, he developed a successful replacement – ironstone china – which was then exported to other countries.

References
Notes

Citations

Sources

English potters
British businesspeople in retailing
1752 births
1822 deaths